The Administrator of the National Aeronautics and Space Administration is the highest-ranking official of NASA, the national space agency of the United States. The administrator is NASA's chief decision maker, responsible for providing clarity to the agency's vision and serving as a source of internal leadership within NASA. The office holder also has an important place within United States space policy, and is assisted by a deputy administrator.

The administrator is appointed by the president of the United States, with the advice and consent of the United States Senate, and thereafter serves at the president’s pleasure. Former senator and astronaut Bill Nelson has served as the administrator since May 3, 2021.

Duties and responsibilities
The administrator serves as NASA's chief executive officer, accountable to the President for the leadership necessary to achieve the agency's mission. This leadership requires articulating the agency's vision, setting its programmatic and budget priorities and internal policies, and assessing Agency performance.

History

The first administrator of NASA was Dr. T. Keith Glennan; during his term he brought together the disparate projects in space development research in the US. Daniel Goldin held the post for the longest term (nearly 10 years), and is best known for pioneering the "faster, better, cheaper" approach to space programs. The only person to hold the post twice is James C. Fletcher, who returned to NASA following the Challenger disaster.

The current administrator is former senator and astronaut Bill Nelson, who was nominated by President Joe Biden on March 19, 2021, confirmed by the Senate on April 29, and officially sworn in on May 3.

List of administrators 
 Status

Line of succession 
The line of succession for the administrator of the National Aeronautics and Space Administration is as follows:
 Deputy administrator of NASA
 Associate administrator of NASA– Deputy associate administrator of NASA (if applicable) 
 Chief of staff to the NASA administrator
 Director of Johnson Space Center (Houston, Texas)
 Director of Kennedy Space Center (Merritt Island, Florida)
 Director of Marshall Space Flight Center (Redstone Arsenal, Alabama)
In the event of there being no deputy administrator of NASA, and the associate administrator serving as acting administrator, then the deputy associate administrator assumes the role of acting deputy administrator.

See also
Chairmen of the National Advisory Committee for Aeronautics
NASA Chief Scientist

References

 
1958 establishments in the United States